Hancheng (韩城市) is a county-level city of Shaanxi, China.

Hancheng may also refer to:

Hancheng, Tangshan (韩城镇), town in Fengrun District, Tangshan, Hebei, China
Seoul, South Korea, often known in Chinese as Hancheng (汉城)